Healesville is a town in Victoria, Australia, 52 km north-east from Melbourne's central business district, located within the Shire of Yarra Ranges local government area. Healesville recorded a population of 7,589 in the 2021 census.

Healesville is situated on the Watts River, a tributary of the Yarra River.

History
Traffic to the more distant Gippsland and Yarra Valley goldfields in the 1860s resulted in a settlement forming on the Watts River and its survey as a town in 1864. It was named after Richard Heales, the Premier of Victoria from 1860–1861. The post office opened on 1 May 1865. The town became a setting off point for the Woods Point Goldfield with the construction of the Yarra Track in the 1870s.

Climate

Present

Healesville is known for the Healesville Sanctuary, a nature park with hundreds of native Australian animals displayed in a semi-open natural setting and an active platypus breeding program.

The Yarra Valley Railway operates from Healesville Station on every Sunday, most public holidays and Wednesday to Sunday during school holidays.

Schools in Healesville include the Healesville Primary School, St Brigid's Catholic primary school, the rural Chum Creek Primary School, Badger Creek Primary School, Healesville High School and Worawa Aboriginal College, an Aboriginal school whose former students include noted Australian Rules Footballer David Wirrpanda.

Much of what is now Healesville lies on the ancestral land of the Wurundjeri people. An Aboriginal reserve known as Coranderrk, set up in 1863, was located just south of the main township.

Industries in and around Healesville include sawmilling, horticulture, tourism and viticulture.

Healesville has an active CFA (Country Fire Authority) volunteer fire brigade established in 1894.  The Healesville Rural Fire Brigade was formed in 1941, then disbanded and membership amalgamated with the Healesville Urban Fire Brigade in 1985. The amalgamation of the Chum Creek Rural Fire Brigade with the Healesville brigade occurred in 1996.  The Healesville Fire Brigade now operates a main and a satellite station with members from both the Healesville and Chum Creek areas.

Healesville is the southern terminus of the Bicentennial Heritage Trail, which, at 5,330 km (3,310 mi), is the longest trail of its type in the world.  The northern end of the trail is at Cooktown, Queensland, a town 328 kilometres (204 mi) north of Cairns.

Population
At the time of the 2016 census, there were 7,461 people in Healesville.
 Aboriginal and Torres Strait Islander people made up 3.7% of the population. 
 77.5% of people were born in Australia. The next most common countries of birth were England 5.6% and New Zealand 1.7%.
 89.5% of people spoke only English at home. 
 The most common responses for religion were No Religion 44.4%, Catholic 16.3% and Anglican 12.2%.

Sport
The town has an Australian rules football team, the Healesville Football Club, competing in the Yarra Valley Mountain District Football League.

Healesville has a tennis club, the Healesville Tennis Club, which competes in the Eastern Region Tennis junior and senior competitions.

Healesville has a picnic horse racing club, Healesville Amateur Racing, which holds around seven race meetings a year with the Healesville Cup meeting in January.

The Healesville Greyhound Racing Club also holds regular greyhound racing meetings at the Healesville Showgrounds and Sporting Complex on Don Road.

Golfers play at the course of the RACV Country Club on Yarra Glen Road.

Healesville has a soccer team known as Healesville Soccer Club that plays in the Victorian State League 4 East.

Notable people
 William Baraka noted Aboriginal artist and Wurundjeri elder who spent much of his life at Coranderrk Station, near Healesville 
 Edith Colemana naturalist and nature writer who completed her pioneering studies of pseudocopulation on native orchids from her house 'Goongarrie' in Healesville
 Gordon Collisan Australian rules football player for Carlton Football Club; Brownlow Medalist in 1964
 Lex Lasrya Supreme Court Judge
 Kelvin Moorean Australian rules football player for the Richmond Football Club
 James Wandin (1933–2006)a Wurundjeri ngurungaeta and Australian Rules footballer with 
 Joy Murphy Wandina Wurundjeri elder
 David Wirrpandaa former Australian rules footballer
 Patrick Wolfe (1946-2016)an Australian historian and social anthropologist

Tourism 
Healesville has been a tourist destination since the 1880s, with the Grand Hotel built in 1888, and the 60-room Gracedale House in 1889 is the best in the area.

A Tourist and Progress Association was created in the 1920s. The association published "Healesville, The World-famed Tourist Resort", listing over 40 beauty spots and 20 hotels and guest houses.

The construction of the Maroondah Dam in the 1920s brought several hundred workmen to Healesville. Their departure and the onset of the 1930s depression exposed Healesville's restricted range of industries. Timber and tourism were not stable enough for sustained and reliable growth. Notwithstanding the depression, the 1930s saw increased motor tourism (partly bypassing Healesville) and decreased railway patronage. Only 10% came by rail at Easter 1934. Tourism was still active but a local newspaper commented that Healesville would be "heaps better off calling itself the good-time town instead of the world-famed-tourist-resort—that's got whiskers on it".

In modern times Healesville has become a major centre for tourism based around the wine and food industries of the Yarra Valley, with attractions including Healesville Sanctuary, Badger Weir Picnic Area, Yarra Valley Railway, Healesville Organic Market, numerous cafes and restaurants, and volunteer-run events such as the Healesville Music Festival, Open Studios, and the Yarra Valley Rodeo.

The Memo, a centre for community arts and cultural activities, was built in 1924 as a soldier's memorial hall.

Film and television
The Internet Movie Database has Healesville and its environs as the filming locations for a number of films and TV programs: the Australian TV series Young Ramsay (1977), Felicity (1979), the natural history TV series Life on Earth (1979), Frog Dreaming (1986), the Australian TV short film Harry's War (1999) and Killer Elite (2011).

Gallery

See also

Yarra Track
Richard Heales

References

Towns in Victoria (Australia)
Yarra Valley
Yarra Ranges